Königstraße is a railway station served by the rapid transit trains of Hamburg S-Bahn lines S1, S2 and S3. The station is located on the underground City S-Bahn line in Altona's Old Town quarter in the Hamburg borough of Altona, Germany. Like all Hamburg S-Bahn stations, Königstraße station is managed by the DB Station&Service GmbH.

Königstraße is located on and named after one of Altona's major roads, between Reeperbahn and Palmaille. The station was opened on 21 April 1979.

Station layout

Königstraße station consists of an underground island platform with two tracks, two mezzanines and two exits. The station is not accessible for handicapped people, because there is no lift and no special floor layout for blind people.

Station services

Trains
The rapid transit trains of the lines S1, S2 and S3 of the Hamburg S-Bahn  call at the station. Direction of the trains on track 1 is Wedel (S1), Hamburg-Altona (S2) and Pinneberg (S3). On track 2 the trains are traveling in the direction Poppenbüttel, Bergedorf (S2) and Stade (S3) via Hamburg Hauptbahnhof.

Facilities
No personnel are in attendance at the station, but there are SOS and information telephones, and ticket machines. There are no parking places, no bicycle stands, and no toilets.

See also

 Hamburger Verkehrsverbund (HVV)
 List of Hamburg S-Bahn stations

References

External links

 DB station information 
 Network plan HVV (pdf) 560 KiB 

Hamburg S-Bahn stations in Hamburg
Railway stations located underground in Hamburg
Buildings and structures in Altona, Hamburg
Railway stations in Germany opened in 1979
1979 establishments in West Germany